The Henry Pyeatte House is a historic house near Canehill, Arkansas.  Located on a rise west of Arkansas Highway 45, it is a vernacular wood-frame I-house structure, two stories high, with single-story ells attached to the eastern and western sides.  A front-gable portico projects over the centered entrance, supported by box columns.  The entrance is framed by sidelight windows, with a transom window above.  The house was built in the 1860s by Henry Pyeatte, son of one of Canehill's founders, and is one of the community's best-preserved houses of the period.

The house was listed on the National Register of Historic Places in 1982.

See also
National Register of Historic Places listings in Washington County, Arkansas

References

Houses on the National Register of Historic Places in Arkansas
Houses completed in 1866
Houses in Washington County, Arkansas
1866 establishments in Arkansas
National Register of Historic Places in Washington County, Arkansas